Bezuprechny was a  of the Soviet and later Russian navy.

Development and design 

The project began in the late 1960s when it was becoming obvious to the Soviet Navy that naval guns still had an important role particularly in support of amphibious landings, but existing gun cruisers and destroyers were showing their age. A new design was started, employing a new  automatic gun turret.

Construction and career 
Bezuprechny was laid down on 29 January 1981 and launched on 25 July 1983 by Zhdanov Shipyard in Leningrad.   She was commissioned on 6 November 1985.

From 5 January 1987, alongside the aircraft carrier  and the cruiser , she saw service in the Mediterranean Sea, tracking the aircraft carrier . From 2 to 5 June, Bezuprechny visited the port of Tripoli in Libya. On 23 June 1987, the destroyer returned to Severomorsk, having covered  in 168 sailing days.

From 4 to 17 March 1989, together with the destroyer , she shadowed the NATO exercise Nord Star and monitored the aircraft carrier .

Subsequently, Bezuprechny visited Liverpool, along with all the other Allied ships.

On 4 August 1994, by order of the Northern Fleet (No. 02868), Bezuprechny was put into reserve. Commencing on 3 November 1994, the vessel underwent repairs and modernization at Severnaya Verf. Due to a lack of funding, the destroyer was later designated for decommissioning.

Gallery

References 

1983 ships
Ships built at Severnaya Verf
Cold War destroyers of the Soviet Union
Sovremenny-class destroyers